The 2014 United States House of Representatives elections in Hawaii were held on Tuesday, November 4, 2014 to elect the two U.S. representatives from the state of Hawaii, one from each of the state's two congressional districts. The elections coincided with the elections of other federal and state offices, including an election for Governor of Hawaii and a special election to the United States Senate.

Overview

By district
Results of the 2014 United States House of Representatives elections in Hawaii by district:

District 1

The 1st district is located entirely on the island of Oahu, encompassing the urban areas of the City and County of Honolulu, a consolidated city-county that includes Oahu's central plains and southern shores, including the towns of Aiea, Mililani, Pearl City, Waipahu and Waimalu. It is the only majority-Asian district in the United States. The incumbent is Democrat Colleen Hanabusa, who has represented the district since 2011. She was re-elected with 54% of the vote in 2012 and the district has a PVI of D+18.

On December 17, 2012, after the death of U.S. Senator Daniel Inouye, it was announced that Inouye had sent a letter shortly before his death to the Governor of Hawaii, Neil Abercrombie, stating his desire that Hanabusa be appointed to his seat. Abercrombie decided against appointing Hanabusa and chose Lieutenant Governor of Hawaii Brian Schatz instead. Hanabusa declined to run for re-election, instead challenging Schatz in the Democratic primary for the special Senate election. She was defeated by Schatz, 48.5% to 47.8%.

Democratic primary

Candidates

Nominee
 Mark Takai, state representative

Eliminated in primary
 Ikaika Anderson, Honolulu City Councilmember
 Stanley Chang, Honolulu City Councilmember
 Will Espero, state senator
 Donna Mercado Kim, President of the Hawaii Senate
 Joey Manahan, Honolulu City Councilmember and former state representative
 Kathryn Xian, women's rights and anti-human trafficking activist

Declined
 Ed Case, former U.S. Representative and candidate for the U.S. Senate in 2006 and 2012
 Colleen Hanabusa, incumbent U.S. Representative
 Daniel Dae Kim, actor
 Mufi Hannemann, former Mayor of Honolulu, candidate for Governor in 2010 and candidate for Hawaii's 2nd congressional district in 2012 (running for Governor)

Endorsements

Polling

Results

Republican primary

Candidates

Nominee
 Charles Djou, former U.S. Representative

Eliminated in primary
 Allan Levene, technology businessman

Declined
 Linda Lingle, former Governor and nominee for the U.S. Senate in 2012

Results

No party primary

Candidates

Declared
 Calvin G. Griffin
 Robert H. Meyer

Results

Neither of the candidates polled enough votes to meet Hawaii's strict criteria for independents to participate in the general election.

General election

Polling

Results

District 2

The 2nd district encompasses the rest of the island of Oahu, including the Windward, North Shore, Central and Leeward regions, as well as the entire state outside of Oahu. This includes the areas located in the counties of Kauai (which includes the islands of Kauai, Niihau, Lehua and Kaula), Maui (which consists of the islands of Maui, Kahoolawe, Lānai, Molokai except for a portion of Molokai that comprises Kalawao County and Molokini) and Hawaii County coextensive with the Island of Hawaii, often called "the Big Island". The incumbent is Democrat Tulsi Gabbard, who has represented the district since 2013. She was elected with 77% of the vote in 2012 and the district has a PVI of D+21.

Democratic primary

Candidates

Nominee
 Tulsi Gabbard, incumbent U.S. Representative

Results

Republican primary

Candidates

Nominee
 Kawika Crowley, homeless handyman and nominee for this seat in 2012

Eliminated in primary
 Marissa D. Capelouto

Results

Libertarian primary

Candidates

Nominee
 Joe Kent

Results

General election

Polling

Results

See also
 2014 United States House of Representatives elections
 United States Senate special election in Hawaii, 2014
 2014 Hawaii gubernatorial election
 2014 United States elections

References

External links
U.S. House elections in Hawaii, 2014 at Ballotpedia
Campaign contributions at OpenSecrets

Hawaii
2014
United States House of Representatives